The Cooper T23, formally called the Cooper Mk.II, is a Formula 2 racing car, built, designed, and developed by British manufacturer Cooper Cars in 1953. It also competed in Formula One, in 9 Grand Prix between 1953 and 1956. It was powered by the Bristol six-cylinder 2-litre engine.

Development
With the Cooper T23, which was also known as the Cooper-Bristol Mk.II, Cooper was able to draw on some experience in single-seater racing car construction. The car had a lightweight tubular frame and a body built with aerodynamics in mind. The engine got its cooling air from two cooling blocks that were installed in the front end. The exhaust gases were discharged laterally through two pipes. There are no similar vehicles from the T23. Changes were made to each new car and only the two works cars received a Bristol engine.

A version with De Dion rear axle and Alta engine was built for Stirling Moss, and at least two other Alta-engined cars were built, but they were no more successful than the Bristol-engined car. This variant is known as the Cooper T24.

Racing history
The Cooper T23 competed in 9 Grands Prix between 1953 and 1956. John Barber was the first to drive it, on behalf of Cooper Car Company, at the 1953 Argentine Grand Prix. Qualified in sixteenth position, he finished eighth.

Bob Gerard, in a private capacity, was the last driver to use the single-seater, in the 1956 British Grand Prix. Qualified in twenty-second place, he finished eleventh.

Ken Wharton, who entered on a private basis, obtained the best result behind the wheel of this car, finishing seventh in the 1953 Swiss Motor Grand Prix where he qualified in ninth place.

The car was overall unsuccessful. In the Drivers' Championship, Bob Gerard and Ken Wharton failed to score points in 1953. Only in Australian Formula Libre racing has Jack Brabham achieved some good results with the T23.

Formula One World Championship results
(key) (results in bold indicate pole position; results in italics indicate fastest lap)

 Nuckey was awarded a starting position despite not only not having practiced, but also not having a car to drive - Brandon drove the car.

References

Cooper racing cars
Formula Two cars